Crassocephalum is a genus the common names of whose members include ragleaf, thickhead, and bologi.  Several species are raised as leaf vegetables and used for medicine, especially in West Africa.  Similar to Senecio, but differing in never having ray florets. A calyculus of short bracts (c.1/4 to 1/5 of the length of the inner phyllaries) is present. The genus is typically thistle-like in appearance, but all parts are soft and not spiny.

Species
Species include:
 Crassocephalum afromontanum R.E. Fr., Acta Horti Berg. 9: 144, 1928
 Crassocephalum aurantiacum (Blume) Kuntze, Revis. Gen. Pl. 1: 331, 1891
 Crassocephalum auriformis S. Moore, J. Linn. Soc., Bot. 37: 171, 1904
 Crassocephalum baoulense (Hutch. & Dalziel) Milne-Redh., Kew Bull. 5: 377, 1951
 Crassocephalum bauchiense (Hutch.) Milne-Redh., Kew Bull. 5: 376, 1951
 Crassocephalum behmianum (Muschl.) S. Moore, J. Bot. 50: 212, 1912
 Crassocephalum biafrae (Oliv. & Hiern) S. Moore, J. Bot. 50: 211, 1912
 Crassocephalum bojeri (DC.) Robyns, Fl. Spermat. Parc Natl. Albert 2: 544, 1947
 Crassocephalum bougheyanum C.D. Adams, J. W. African Sci. Assoc. 3: 111, 1957
 Crassocephalum bumbense S. Moore, J. Linn. Soc., Bot. 47: 279, 1925
 Crassocephalum butaguensis (Muschl.) S. Moore, J. Bot. 50: 211, 1912
 Crassocephalum cernuum (L. f.) Moench, Suppl. Pl. 370, 1781
 Crassocephalum coeruleum (O. Hoffm.) R.E. Fr., Wiss. Erg. Schwed. Rhod.-Kongo Exp. 342, 1916
 Crassocephalum crepidioides (Benth.) S. Moore, J. Bot. 50(595): 211–212, 1912
 Crassocephalum diversifolium Hiern, Cat. Afr. Pl. 1(3): 594, 1898
 Crassocephalum ducis-aprutii (Chiov.) S. Moore, J. Bot. 50: 212, 1912
 Crassocephalum effusum (Mattf.) C. Jeffrey, Kew Bull. 41(4): 907, 1986
 Crassocephalum flavum Decne., Ann. Sci. Nat., Bot., sér. 2, 2: 265, 1834
 Crassocephalum gossweileri S. Moore, J. Bot. 56: 226, 1918
 Crassocephalum gracile (Hook. f.) Milne-Redh. ex Guinea, Anales Jard. Bot. Madrid 1: 307, 1951
 Crassocephalum guineense C.D. Adams, J. W. African Sci. Assoc. 8: 129, 1964
 Crassocephalum heteromorphum (Hutch. & Burtt.) C. Jeffrey, Kew Bull. 41(4): 908, 1986
 Crassocephalum lemuricum (Humbert) Humbert, Fl. Madagasc. 189(3): 832, 1963
 Crassocephalum libericum S. Moore, J. Bot. 54: 282, 1916
 Crassocephalum longirameum S. Moore, J. Bot. 58: 46, 1920
 Crassocephalum luteum (Humbert) Humbert, Fl. Madagasc. 189(3): 836, 1963
 Crassocephalum macropappus (Sch. Bip. ex A. Rich.) S. Moore, J. Bot. 1912(1): 212, 1912
 Crassocephalum manampanihense (Humbert) Humbert, Fl. Madagasc. 189(3): 835, 1963
 Crassocephalum mannii (Hook. f.) Milne-Redh., Kew Bull. 5: 377, 1951
 Crassocephalum miniatum (Welw.) Hiern, Cat. Afr. Pl. 1: 595, 1898
 Crassocephalum montuosum (S. Moore) Milne-Redh., Kew Bull. 5: 376, 1951
 Crassocephalum multicorymbosum (Klatt) S. Moore, J. Bot. 50: 211, 1912
 Crassocephalum notonioides S. Moore, J. Bot. 40: 341, 1902
 Crassocephalum paludum C. Jeffrey, Kew Bull. 41(4): 906, 1986
 Crassocephalum picridifolium (DC.) S. Moore, J. Bot. 50: 212, 1912
 Crassocephalum radiatum S. Moore, J. Bot. 56: 227, 1918
 Crassocephalum rubens (B. Juss. ex Jacq.) S. Moore, J. Bot. 50: 212, 1912
 Crassocephalum ruwenzoriensis S. Moore, J. Linn. Soc., Bot. 35: 352, 1902
 Crassocephalum sarcobasis (DC.) S. Moore, J. Bot. 50: 211, 1912
 Crassocephalum scandens (O. Hoffm.) Hiern, Cat. Afr. Pl. 595, 1898
 Crassocephalum sonchifolium (Baker) Humbert, Fl. Madagasc. 189(3): 834, 1963
 Crassocephalum sonchifolium (L.) Less., Linnaea 6(2): 252, 1831
 Crassocephalum splendens C. Jeffrey, Kew Bull. 41: 905, 1986
 Crassocephalum subscandens (Hochst. ex A. Rich.) S. Moore, J. Bot. 50: 211, 1912
 Crassocephalum togoense C.D. Adams, J. W. African Sci. Assoc. 1: 27, 1954
 Crassocephalum uvens (Hiern) S. Moore, J. Bot. 50: 212, 1912
 Crassocephalum valerianifolium (Link ex Spreng.) Less., Linnaea 5(1): 163, 1830
 Crassocephalum vitellinum (Benth.) S. Moore, J. Bot. 50: 212, 1912

References

External links
 PROTAbase on Crassocephalum

 
Leaf vegetables
Asteraceae genera
Plants used in traditional African medicine